Staurothele is a genus of saxicolous (rock-dwelling), crustose lichens in the family Verrucariaceae. It has about 40 species. When the fungus is part of a lichen, the genus of lichen is commonly called rock pimples.

Species
Staurothele alboterrestris 
Staurothele ambrosiana 
Staurothele arctica 
Staurothele areolata 
Staurothele bacilligera 
Staurothele caesia 
Staurothele clopima 
Staurothele dendritica 
Staurothele desquamescens 
Staurothele drummondii 
Staurothele elenkinii 
Staurothele fissa 
Staurothele frustulenta 
Staurothele geoica 
Staurothele guestphalica 
Staurothele honghensis 
Staurothele hymenogonia 
Staurothele nemorum  – USA
Staurothele oxneri 
Staurothele pulvinata 
Staurothele rufa 
Staurothele rugosa 
Staurothele rugulosa 
Staurothele rupifraga 
Staurothele septentrionalis 
Staurothele succedens

References

Verrucariales
Eurotiomycetes genera
Lichen genera
Taxa described in 1852